The Tacoma Rockets were a professional ice hockey team in Tacoma, Washington from 1946 to 1953.

The Rockets played in the Pacific Coast Hockey League from 1946 to 1952, which was renamed the Western Hockey League during the Rockets' final season of 1952–1953. For that final season, they played their home games in the Tacoma Ice Palace, having previously played at the Tacoma Arena.

The Rockets name was resurrected from 1991 to 1995 in the new major junior Western Hockey League, until the team's relocation to Kelowna, British Columbia.

Season-by-season records
Note: GP = Games played, W = Wins, L = Losses, T = Ties Pts = Points, GF = Goals for, GA = Goals against

References

1946 establishments in Washington (state)
1953 disestablishments in Washington (state)
Defunct ice hockey teams in the United States
Ice hockey clubs established in 1946
Ice hockey clubs disestablished in 1953
Ice hockey teams in Washington (state)
Western Hockey League (1952–1974) teams